Cathedral of the Fens may refer to one of several Fenland churches in Eastern England:

 Ely Cathedral, Cambridgeshire
 St Mary Magdalene Church, Gedney, Lincolnshire
 St Peter's Church, Walpole St Peter, Norfolk